Glengarry is a rural locality in the local government area of West Tamar in the Launceston region of Tasmania. The 2016 census has a population of 525 for the state suburb of Glengarry.

History
Glengarry Post Office opened on 1 December 1878. The name is Scottish in origin. Glengarry was gazetted as a locality in 1966.

Geography
The Supply River forms part of the northern boundary. Tunks Creek, a tributary of the Supply River, flows through from south to north.

Road infrastructure
Route B71 (Frankford Road) passes through from north-east to south-west. Route C716 (Lamont Road) starts at an intersection with B71 and runs north-west until it exits. Route C718 (Glengarry Road) starts at an intersection with B71 and runs north until it exits.

References

Localities of West Tamar Council
Towns in Tasmania